Niko Kappel (born 1 March 1995) is a German Paralympic athlete of short stature. He represented Germany at the 2016 Summer Paralympics in Rio de Janeiro, Brazil and he won the gold medal in the men's shot put F41 event. He also represented Germany at the 2020 Summer Paralympics in Tokyo, Japan and he won the bronze medal in the men's shot put F41 event.

At the 2015 World Championships held in Doha, Qatar, he won the silver medal in the men's shot put F41 event. He also won the silver medal in the men's shot put F40/F41 event at the 2016 European Championships. At the 2017 World Championships he won the gold medal in the men's shot put F41 event and he won the silver medal in the men's shot put F41 event at the 2018 European Championships.

In 2016 and 2017, he won the German Sportspersonality of the Year award in his category (male athletes with a disability).

References

External links 

 
 

1995 births
Living people
German male shot putters
Paralympic athletes of Germany
Paralympic gold medalists for Germany
Paralympic bronze medalists for Germany
Paralympic medalists in athletics (track and field)
Athletes (track and field) at the 2016 Summer Paralympics
Athletes (track and field) at the 2020 Summer Paralympics
Medalists at the 2016 Summer Paralympics
Medalists at the 2020 Summer Paralympics
World Para Athletics Championships winners
Medalists at the World Para Athletics European Championships
Competitors in athletics with dwarfism
People from Schwäbisch Gmünd
Sportspeople from Stuttgart (region)
20th-century German people
21st-century German people